Mary A. Gardner Holland, also known as Mary G. Holland, was a Union nurse during the American Civil War. 

In 1897, more than thirty years after the war, Holland compiled accounts from numerous Civil War nurses into her book Our Army Nurses: Stories from Women in the Civil War. The book begins with an introduction by Holland herself; she writes "what more fitting place for women with holy motives and tenderest sympathy than on those fields of blood and death or in retreats prepared for our suffering heroes?" 

According to Holland's account, she worked in hospitals for about fourteen months. She would have enlisted earlier, she writes, if she didn't have an aging mother depending upon her. Ultimately, Holland cared for her mother during the day then worked with the Sanitary Commission on weekday evenings until Holland wrote to Dorothea Dix asking to be recruited. Holland was stationed at Columbia College Hospital in Meridian Heights, a suburb of Washington, D.C. From there she went to West Washington and then to Annapolis, serving as a matron.

References 

Women in the American Civil War
American Civil War nurses
American women nurses
American non-fiction writers
19th-century American women writers
American women non-fiction writers